In molecular biology, the epsilon antitoxin, produced by various prokaryotes, forms part of a post-segregational killing system, which is involved in the initiation of programmed cell death of plasmid-free cells. The protein is folded into a three-helix bundle that directly interacts with the zeta toxin, inactivating it.

References

Protein domains